The Great Rift Valley of Ethiopia, (or Main Ethiopian Rift or Ethiopian Rift Valley) is a branch of the East African Rift that runs through Ethiopia in a southwest direction from the Afar Triple Junction. In the past, it was seen as part of a "Great Rift Valley" that ran from Mozambique to Syria.

Description

The Great Rift Valley lies between the Ethiopian Plateau to the north and the Somalia Plateau to the south. The rift developed as the Nubian and Somali plates began to separate during the Miocene Period along the East African rift system. Rift initiation was asynchronous along the Ethiopian rift valley: deformation began around 18 million years ago at the south end, around 11 million years ago close to the Afar depression and probably around 6-8 million years ago in the central sector. The rift is extending in an ESE-WNW direction at about  annually.

These faults are now thought to be inactive at the northern rift valley termination, whereas to the south they are still tectonically and seismically active. The rift floor is cut by a series of smaller en echelon, right-stepping, rift basins of Quaternary to recent age. In the northern part of the rift, extension within the valley is now thought to be mainly along these faulted and magmatically active segments. These segments are considered to be developing mid ocean ridge spreading centers.

Ethiopian Rift Valley lakes 

The ethiopia Rift Valley lakes are the northernmost of the African Rift Valley Lakes. The Ethiopian Rift Valley lakes occupy the floor of the rift valley between the two highlands. Most of the Ethiopian Rift Valley lakes do not have an outlet, and most are alkaline. Although the Ethiopian Rift Valley Lakes are of great importance to Ethiopia's economy, as well as being essential to the survival of the local people, there were no intensive and extensive limnological studies undertaken of these lakes until recently.

The major ones are
 Lake Abaya (1162 km2, elevation 1285 m), the largest Ethiopian Rift Valley lake
 Lake Chamo (551 km2, elevation 1235 m)
 Lake Zway (485 km2, elevation 1636 m)
 Lake Shala (329 km2, elevation 1558 m), the deepest Ethiopian Rift Valley lake
 Lake Koka (250 km2, elevation 1590 m)
 Lake Langano (230 km2, elevation 1585 m)
 Lake Abijatta (205 km2, elevation 1573 m)
 Lake Awasa (129 km2, elevation 1708 m)

References

Rifts and grabens
Great Rift Valley
Geology of Ethiopia
Volcanoes of Ethiopia